The 1952 NAIA basketball tournament was held in March at Municipal Auditorium in Kansas City, Missouri. The 15th annual NAIA basketball tournament featured 32 teams playing in a single-elimination format. 
In 1952, the National Association of Intercollegiate Basketball (NAIB) changes its name to the National Association of Intercollegiate Athletics (NAIA)

The championship game featured Southwest Missouri State, now Missouri State University, who defeated Murray State, 73–64.

Finishing out the NAIA Final Four, and playing for the 3rd place game were Southwest Texas State, now Texas State University–San Marcos, and Portland. The Bears of Southwest Missouri State defeated the Pilots of Portland, 78–68.

A notorious game happened in the first round between Moringside and Pepperdine. There was a tournament record of forty personal fouls between the two teams in one game. Incidentally,  Morningside would win the game 84 to 80.

Awards and honors
Many of the records set by the 1952 tournament have been broken, and many of the awards were established much later:
Leading scorer est. 1963
Leading rebounder est. 1963
Charles Stevenson Hustle Award est. 1958
Coach of the Year est. 1954
Player of the Year est. 1994
Most personal fouls in one game: 40, Pepperdine (Calif.) vs. Morningside (Iowa)
All-time scoring leader; first appearance: E.C. O'Neal, 9th, Arkansas Tech (1952,53,54,55), 13 games, 122 field goals, 43 free throws, totaling 287 points, 22.1 average per game.
All-time scoring leaders; third appearance: Lloyd Thorgaard, 10th, Hamline (Minn.) (1950,51,52,53), 15 games, 111 field goals,  61 free throws,  283 total points, 18.9 average per game; James Fritsche, 14th, Hamline (Minn.) (1950,51,52,53), 15 games, 113 field goals, 46 free throws,  272 total points, 18.1 average per game.

Bracket

  *  denotes each overtime.

See also
 1952 NCAA basketball tournament
 1952 National Invitation Tournament

References

NAIA Men's Basketball Championship
Tournament
NAIA men's basketball tournament
NAIA men's basketball tournament